Patrick Ludlow (March 24, 1903 – January 27, 1996) was a British actor predominantly on stage, with his own touring theatre company from 1943.

Filmography

References

External links

1903 births
1996 deaths
People from Kensington
English male stage actors
English male film actors
English male television actors
20th-century English male actors